Türksat Satellite Communications Cable TV and Operations Incorporated is the sole communications satellite operator in Turkey. It was established on 21 December 1990 as a state-owned company named Türksat Milli Haberleşme Uyduları (Türksat National Communications Satellites) in Gölbaşı, Ankara Province; eventually incorporating the satellite services of Türk Telekomünikasyon A.Ş. and becoming Türksat A.Ş. on 22 July 2004. Türksat A.Ş. also owns 100% of the shares of Eurasiasat S.A.M., jointly established as a spin-off company with Aérospatiale in 1996 to manufacture and launch Türksat 2A (Eurasiasat 1) in 2001.

Hasan Hüseyin ERTOK was appointed as the General Manager of Türksat A.Ş on January 21, 2021.

Satellites 
Türksat A.Ş. has launched the Türksat series of satellites, and operated in the past Türksat 1C, Türksat 2A, Türksat 3A and Astra 1D (lease capacity) communications satellites. Currently, Türksat 4A is in operation. The company conducts satellite telecommunication at its Gölbaşı Ground Station in Ankara. Türksat 4A was launched on 17 February 2014 in cooperation with Rosoboronexport.

Cable TV and internet service 
Turksat founded Teledünya, a digital cable TV and internet service, on 1 November 2008.

See also 

 Türksat (satellite)

References

External links 
 Website

Communications satellite operators
Engineering companies of Turkey
Satellite television
Space program of Turkey
Telecommunications companies of Turkey
Telecommunications companies established in 1990
Companies based in Ankara
Gölbaşı, Ankara
Government-owned companies of Turkey
Turkish brands
Turkish companies established in 1990